Emily Dole (September 28, 1957 – January 2, 2018) was an American athlete, actress and professional wrestler. She is best known for her appearances with Gorgeous Ladies of Wrestling under the ring name Mountain Fiji (abbreviated in publications and her official logo as Mt. Fiji).

Track and field career 
A 1976 graduate of Cypress High School, Dole threw the shot put at 50½ feet. This won Emily two Amateur Athletic Union (AAU)  awards in 1975: number two distance in the U.S.A. for the Women's Division and number one distance in the U.S.A. for the Junior Division. Until 2000, only two other California high school girls had achieved that feat.  She qualified for two Olympic Trials, finishing fifth in 1976 and seventh in 1980.  Both Trials were won by Maren Seidler during her 4 Trials winning streak.  Dole joined Seidler and several other elite athletes of the period in playing supporting roles in the film Personal Best starring Mariel Hemingway and Scott Glenn (1982).

Professional wrestling career 
In 1985, as Mt. Fiji occasionally elongated to Mountain Fiji, she was part of the original cast of the Gorgeous Ladies of Wrestling.  At 350 pounds, she dwarfed all of the other members of the cast, the closest competitor being the glamazon queen Matilda the Hun, who she feuded with for the first two seasons.  During those first two seasons she was also given a kayfabe little sister, Little Fiji, who as one of the smallest members of the cast always needed rescuing.  For the third and fourth seasons she was given a new nemesis, Big Bad Mama.  There were many  gimmick matches and handicap situations, to the extreme of Fiji being chained to the ringpost.  Throughout her run with the promotion, she never lost a match.  It was a notable event if she was knocked off her feet.

Wrestling led to other appearances on the Hard Time on Planet Earth, Mama's Family and Son in Law. She also appeared in an audience polling group with nine other female wrestlers on the CBS daytime version of Card Sharks in 1988 and picked up host Bob Eubanks.

Emily Dole was interviewed and featured in the 2012 documentary film GLOW: The Story of the Gorgeous Ladies of Wrestling.

Bridal shower incident 
Toward the end of the series, while segments of Life in the GLOW House were being shot for season four, Dole's family was involved in an incident with the Los Angeles County Sheriff's Department on February 11, 1989.  The incident involved an overwhelming force of sheriffs in riot gear invading the family home in Cerritos, California during a bridal shower for Dole's sister, Melinda.  Much like the Rodney King incident two years later, the event was videotaped by a neighbor, Doug Botts, showing the police beating 36 members of the family. After being a TV celebrity for three years on National TV, the massive Dole took a passive stance, arms folded in the middle of the street, where the video showed her being beaten to the ground with police batons and flashlights. The 36 members of the party, all Samoan, were beaten and arrested. The Samoan-American community was angered, contending the incident was racist in nature.  The family represented by Garo Mardirossian sued the Sheriff's Department and won a $24,850,000 jury verdict with interest. The legal process included taking the depositions of Sheriff Sherman Block and over 50 deputies. In response, Dole said, "Thank God it's over with.  This goes to show that in the United States of America, justice does prevail.  Nine years is a long, long time. We can forgive, but we cannot forget."

Personal life 
Dole had many health problems over the years and had been staying in an assisted living facility. In 2008 Dole got up to 425 pounds but then turned things around and cut her weight down to 235 pounds. In 2012 she was featured on GLOW: The Story of the Gorgeous Ladies of Wrestling where she was struggling with her health issues. On January 2, 2018, she died at the age of 60.

Filmography

References

External links 
 
 

1957 births
2018 deaths
20th-century American actresses
Actresses of Samoan descent
American female professional wrestlers
American female shot putters
American film actresses
American professional wrestlers of Samoan descent
American sportspeople of Samoan descent
American television actresses
People from Orange, California
Professional wrestlers from California
Track and field athletes from California
21st-century American women